The Romania women's national under-18 ice hockey team is the women's national under-18 ice hockey team of Romania. The team is controlled by the Romanian Ice Hockey Federation, a member of the International Ice Hockey Federation. In 2016 the team debuted at the IIHF World Women's U18 Championships where they competed in the Division I Qualification tournament, finishing in last place.

History
In January 2016 the Romanian women's national under-18 ice hockey team debuted at the IIHF World Women's U18 Championships where they played in the 2016 Division I Qualification tournament in Spittal an der Drau and Radenthein, Austria. Romania was placed in Group A with Austria, China and Kazakhstan. The team finished last in Group A's preliminary round after losing all three of their games, which included their largest loss on record after Kazakhstan defeated them 15–0. Romania then progressed to the seventh place classification game against Australia, who had finished last in Group B. Romania was defeated by Australia 6–7 following a shootout and finished the tournament in eighth place. Alina Oprea was selected as the best Romanian player of the tournament.

International competitions
2016 IIHF World Women's U18 Championships. Finish: 8th in Division I Qualification (22nd overall)
2017 IIHF World Women's U18 Championships. Finish: 4th in Division I B Qualification (24th overall)

Team roster
For the 2016 IIHF Ice Hockey U18 Women's World Championship Division I Qualification

References

External links
Romanian Ice Hockey Federation website 

 
Ice hockey
Women's national under-18 ice hockey teams